The Verona Palimpsest (or Fragmentum Veronese) is a manuscript, dated about the 494 AD, which contains a Christian collection of Church Orders in Latin. The manuscript, which contains many lacunae, is the only source of the Latin version of the Apostolic Tradition.

Description
This manuscript is preserved in the Chapter House Library (Biblioteca Capitolare) in Verona and is numbered LV (olim 53). It is a palimpsest in which the Sententiae of Isidore of Seville in the 8th century has been written over the previous content, which includes:
 Didascalia Apostolorum (of which 32 leaves of 86 total were preserved) 
 Apostolic Church-Ordinance (of which 1.5 leaves of 4.5 total were preserved)
 the Egyptian Church Order, better known as Apostolic Tradition, (of which 6.5 leaves of 11.5 total were preserved). Chapters 9 through 20, 22 through 25, and 39 and 40 are missing completely. 
 a leaf containing Fasti consulares running to 494, which allows for dating of the manuscript.

Publication

This Palimpsest was discovered in 1896 and fully published in 1900 by Edmund Hauler. A further edition was published by Erik Tidner in 1963

Notes

See also
 Apostolic Constitutions
 Alexandrine Sinodos

External links
Edmund Hauler, Didascaliae apostolorum fragmenta ueronensia Latina,  1900: full text in Latin

Ancient church orders
5th-century Christian texts
Palimpsests